Batiaghata is an upazila of Khulna District in the Division of Khulna, Bangladesh.

Geography
The Kajibacha river divides it into an eastern and a western part. It has 23698 households and total area 248.33 km2.

Demographics
According to the 1991 Bangladesh census, Batiaghata had a population of 128184. Males constituted 51.07% of the population, and females 48.93%. The population aged 18 or over is 71,463. Batiaghata has an average literacy rate of 37.7% (7+ years), compared to the national average of 32.4%.

Points of interest
 Baroaria Bazar
 Baintala Bazaar
 Pagol r Mandir
 Prem Kanon
 Batiaghata Bridge
 Gopalkhali Park
 Kazibacha River
 Batiaghata Bazaar
 Guptamari Gram
 Premkanon Family Picnic Corner
 Tamim Telecom Hatbati

Administration
Batiaghata Upazila is divided into seven union parishads: Amirpur, Baliadanga, Botiaghata, Gongarampur, Jolma, Surkhali, and Vandarkote. The union parishads are subdivided into 127 mauzas and 172 villages.

Education

Primary schools
 Batiaghata Govt. Primary School
 Bayarbhanga Govt. Primary School
 Bayarbhanga Paschim Para Primary School
 Guptamary Govt. Primary School
 Chakrakhali  Govt. Primary School
 Kashiadanga Govt. Primary School
 Khalshibunia Govt. Primary School
 Maitvanga Govt. Primary school
 44 no. K. Baintala Govt. Primary School
 Saleha begum govt primary School
 Hetalbunia Primary School

Secondary school
 Batiaghata Thana Head Quarters Pilot Model Secondary School
 Batiaghata High School
 Bayarbhanga Biswambhara High school
 Jolma Chokrakhali Secondary School
 Khalshibunia G.P.B. High School
 Kharabad Baintala High School
 Gaoghara High School
 Batiaghata Thana Head Quarters Girls High School
 Rashmohan Girls High School, Bayarbhanga
 B.L.G. High school

College
 Khagendranath Girls College
 Gariardanga Adarsha College
 Batiaghata College
 Kharabad Baintala School & College

Nearest tourist points
 Shat Gombuj Mosque
 Sundarban
 Mongla Port
 Khulna City
 Shitala Bari Temple
 Chandramohol

See also
Upazilas of Bangladesh
Districts of Bangladesh
Divisions of Bangladesh
Jalma Union

References

Upazilas of Khulna District
Khulna Division